APICA (2NE1, SDB-001, N-(1-adamantyl)-1-pentyl-1H-indole-3-carboxamide) is an indole based drug that acts as a potent agonist for the cannabinoid receptors.

It had never previously been reported in the scientific or patent literature, and was first identified by laboratories in Japan in March 2012 as an ingredient in synthetic cannabis smoking blends, along with its indazole derivative APINACA (sold as "AKB48").

Structurally it closely resembles cannabinoid compounds from patent WO 2003/035005 but with an indole core instead of indazole, and a simple pentyl chain on the indole 1-position. Given the known metabolic liberation (and presence as an impurity) of amantadine in the related compound APINACA, it is suspected that metabolic hydrolysis of the amide group of APICA may also release amantadine.

Pharmacological testing determined APICA to have an IC50 of 175 nM at CB1, only slightly less potent than JWH-018 which had an IC50 of 169 nM, but over four times more tightly binding than APINACA, which had an IC50 of 824 nM. The first published synthesis and pharmacological evaluation of APICA revealed that it acts as a full agonist at CB1 (EC50 = 34 nM) and CB2 receptors (EC50 = 29 nM). Furthermore, APICA possesses cannabis-like effects in rats, and appears to be less potent than JWH-018 but more potent than THC.

Legal Status

As of October 2015 APICA is a controlled substance in China.

See also 

 5F-AB-PINACA
 5F-ADB
 5F-AMB
 5F-APINACA
 AB-FUBINACA
 AB-CHFUPYCA
 AB-CHMINACA
 AB-PINACA
 ADAMANTYL-THPINACA
 ADB-CHMINACA
 ADB-FUBINACA
 ADB-PINACA
 ADBICA
 MDMB-CHMICA
 SDB-006
 STS-135 (drug)
 PX-3

References 

Cannabinoids
Designer drugs
Indolecarboxamides
Adamantanes